This is a list of Panama women's international footballers who have played for the Panama women's national football team.

Players

See also 
 Panama women's national football team

References 

 
International footballers
football
Panama
Football in Panama
Association football player non-biographical articles